Emirates Flight Training Academy (EFTA), is a pilot-training school based in the United Arab Emirates. Founded in 2017, it is a subsidiary of multinational aviation corporation, The Emirates Group, and its airline division, Emirates.

History
The school was officially opened in 2017 during Dubai Airshow and started with a fleet of six training aircraft. Plans include for a total fleet of 27 aircraft: 22 Cirrus SR22s and five Embraer Phenom 100s.

With its own private airport and campus, the school is located at the edge of Dubai World Central Airport, and will act as the dedicated training center for the country's National Cadet Pilot Programme as well as international students. 
In 2017, the school signed an agreement with American aircraft manufacturer Boeing for collaboration on training curriculum for managing cadet learning and training flight operations.

See also
Emirates Aviation University

References

External links

The Emirates Group
Educational institutions established in 2017
Aviation schools
2017 establishments in the United Arab Emirates